Gobardanga Khantura High School [ H.S.] is a higher secondary school in Gobardanga, North 24 Parganas, West Bengal, India. The school was established in 1856 and is administered by the West Bengal Board of Secondary Education.It is one of the oldest schools of West Bengal. This school is older than Calcutta University.

See also
Education in India
List of schools in India
Education in West Bengal

References

External links 

Boys' schools in India
High schools and secondary schools in West Bengal
Schools in North 24 Parganas district
Educational institutions established in 1856
1856 establishments in India